Laos has no established Jewish presence, but as this communist country gradually opens up to foreign tourism, Chabad has secured permission to establish a permanent presence in Luang Prabang in 2006, where the young Rabbi Avraham Leitner provides meals and shelter to Jewish travelers. In all, there are only four permanent Jewish residents in the country, who serve the Israeli backpackers, tourists, and diplomats visiting Laos.

History
Laos is notable for a lack of antisemitism. According to a 2014 report from the Anti-Defamation League, Laos is among the least antisemitic countries in the world.

References

Jews
Jews
Laos
Laos